Márton Erdős (17 September 1944 – 25 November 2020) was a Hungarian wrestler. He competed in the men's freestyle 52 kg at the 1968 Summer Olympics.

References

External links
 

1944 births
2020 deaths
Hungarian male sport wrestlers
Olympic wrestlers of Hungary
Wrestlers at the 1968 Summer Olympics
Sport wrestlers from Budapest